Banksia Swamp is a swamp in Victoria, Australia. It is located within the Gippsland Lakes complex.

The name refers to the plant genus Banksia, which grows in the area.

References

Bodies of water of Victoria (Australia)
Swamps of Australia